Pieter "Pier" Janssen (born 9 September 1956), also referred to as Pierre or Piet, is a Belgian former footballer and manager who played as a midfielder and made three appearances for the Belgium national team.

Career
Janssen made his international debut for Belgium on 19 November 1986 in a UEFA Euro 1988 qualifying match against Bulgaria, in which he scored the opening goal of the 1–1 home draw. He went on to make three appearances, scoring one goal, before making his last appearance on 29 April 1987 in a UEFA Euro 1988 qualifying match against the Republic of Ireland, which finished as a 0–0 draw.

Career statistics

International

International goals

References

External links
 
 
 

1956 births
Living people
People from Bree, Belgium
Footballers from Limburg (Belgium)
Belgian footballers
Belgium international footballers
Association football midfielders
K. Waterschei S.V. Thor Genk players
R.S.C. Anderlecht players
K.S.C. Lokeren Oost-Vlaanderen players
K.R.C. Genk players
Belgian Pro League players
Challenger Pro League players
Belgian Third Division players
Belgian football managers
K.R.C. Genk managers
K. Patro Eisden Maasmechelen managers